was a Japanese composer of contemporary classical music and professor.

Biography
Tomojiro Ikenouchi was born in Tokyo as son of a haiku poet Kyoshi Takahama. He traveled to Paris in 1927, where he studied composition with Henri Büsser and piano with Lazare Lévy. His music is influenced by French Impressionist music. He returned to Japan in 1933.

Ikenouchi taught at the Tokyo National University of Fine Arts and Music beginning in 1947. His notable students include Isang Yun, Toshi Ichiyanagi, Toshiro Mayuzumi, Maki Ishii, Shin-ichiro Ikebe, Makoto Shinohara, Akira Miyoshi, Akio Yashiro, Roh Ogura, Kōhei Tanaka, Teizo Matsumura, Masato Uchida and Ryohei Hirose.  Along with several of his students, he formed the Shinshin Kai group in 1955.

His works are published by Ongaku-no-Tomo Sha. 
His granddaughter is cellist, Kristina Reiko Cooper.

References
Cooper, Kristina Reiko (2001). "Tomojiro Ikenouchi and His Influences." DMA dissertation. The Juilliard School. Aspen: profile of Cooper, Kristina Reiko

1906 births
1991 deaths
20th-century classical composers
20th-century Japanese composers
20th-century Japanese male musicians
Conservatoire de Paris alumni
Japanese classical composers
Japanese male classical composers
Keio University alumni
Musicians from Tokyo
Recipients of the Legion of Honour